Fouad Makhzoumi (born 1952) is a Lebanese billionaire, businessman and politician, founder of the National Dialogue Party. In the 2018 Lebanese elections, Makhzoumi was elected Member of Parliament (Beirut MP).

Early life
Makhzoumi was born in Beirut, Lebanon in 1952. He has bachelor's and master's degrees in chemical engineering from Michigan Technological University.

Career
In 1984, Makhzoumi co-founded Future Pipe Industries, and was CEO from 1986 to 2003, when his son, Rami, took over as CEO, with Makhzoumi as chairman until 2011, when he resumed the CEO role.

In 2018 and 2022 he was elected to the Lebanese Parliament (Beirut II district, Sunni seat).

Political donations
In 2010, the British Conservative Party received a donation of £300,000 from his wife, May Makhzoumi. In 2013, it was reported that May had given the Conservative Party another £500,000 earlier that year, bringing her total donations since 2010 to over £1 million.

In 2017, it was reported by The Guardian that François Fillon, the French presidential candidate, had allegedly been paid $50,000 to arrange a meeting between Makhzoumi, the Russian President Vladimir Putin, and Patrick Pouyane, the chief executive of the French energy multinational Total.

Personal life
Makhzoumi and his wife May have three children, Rami (died 2011, brain aneurysm), Tamara, and Camellia.

May Makhzoumi lives in Kensington, London.

References

1952 births
Living people
Politicians from Beirut
People from Kensington
Michigan Technological University alumni
20th-century Lebanese businesspeople
21st-century Lebanese businesspeople
Lebanese billionaires